Anarsia inculta is a moth of the  family Gelechiidae. It was described by Walsingham in 1891. It is found in South Africa and Gambia.

References

inculta
Moths described in 1891
Fauna of the Gambia
Moths of Africa